Ben Crocker (born 19 February 1997) is a former professional Australian rules footballer who played for the Adelaide Football Club in the Australian Football League (AFL). He also previously played for the Collingwood Football Club.

State football
Crocker played for the Kew Comets and the Canterbury Cobras in the Yarra Junior Football League in his youth. Crocker played and captained the Oakleigh Chargers, leading them to a premiership, kicking a goal against Eastern Ranges in the 2015 TAC Cup season Grand Final. He represented Vic Metro at 2015 AFL Under 18 Championships, serving as vice-captain together with Sam Weideman and Nick O'Kearney under captain Theo Thompson. He kicked a goal in the opening match against Vic Country, where he was named amongst the best players, and kicked goals against South Australia and in the second match against Vic Country. In the final match of the Championships, Crocker kicked three goals against South Australia, including the winning goal.

AFL career

Collingwood
Crocker was drafted by Collingwood with the 65th pick of the 2015 national draft. After showing good form in the Victorian Football League (VFL), kicking seven goals in four matches and averaging 11 disposals per match, he made his debut for Collingwood's senior team on 7 May 2016 against their arch-rivals Carlton. In October 2019, Crocker was delisted by Collingwood, but was allowed to continue training at the Holden Centre.

Adelaide
Crocker was given a second chance in November, when he was re-drafted by Adelaide in the 2020 rookie draft. Tyson Goldsack, Crocker's room-mate, former team-mate, and current development coach at Port Adelaide, claimed that he has what it takes to make it in the AFL. Crocker trained and worked hard after arriving in Adelaide, making captain Rory Sloane say he deserves a spot in the best 22. He made his debut for Adelaide in the second round of the 2020 season, against Port Adelaide, kicking a goal.

Crocker was delisted at the end of 2020. He signed for the Carlton reserves in 2021.

Personal life
Crocker grew up as a Collingwood supporter, living next door to former captain Scott Burns. He was educated at Carey Baptist Grammar School. His brother, Sam, was drafted by St Kilda in the 2010 draft, but he was delisted after two years without making a senior appearance. In 2014, Crocker's father, Paul, was diagnosed with early onset dementia, and he became an ambassador for Dementia Australia, helping raise funds.

Statistics
Statistics are correct to the end of 2020 season

|- style="background-color: #eaeaea"
! scope="row" style="text-align:center" | 2016
|
| 39 || 10 || 10 || 6 || 50 || 41 || 91 || 30 || 13 || 1.0 || 0.6 || 5.0 || 4.1 || 9.1 || 3.0 || 1.3
|- 
! scope="row" style="text-align:center" | 2017
|
| 39 || 3 || 3 || 2 || 18 || 11 || 29 || 14 || 8 || 1.0 || 0.7 || 6.0 || 3.7 || 9.7 || 4.7 || 2.7
|- style="background-color: #eaeaea"
! scope="row" style="text-align:center" | 2018
|
| 39 || 10 || 5 || 8 || 74 || 31 || 105 || 42 || 16 || 0.5 || 0.8 || 7.4 || 3.1 || 10.5 || 4.2 || 1.6
|-
! scope="row" style="text-align:center" | 2019
|
| 39 || 3 || 3 || 2 || 17 || 6 || 23 || 9 || 9 || 1.0 || 0.7 || 5.7 || 2.0 || 7.7 || 3.0 || 3.0
|- style="background-color: #eaeaea"
! scope="row" style="text-align:center" | 2020
|
| 20 || 7|| 4 || 5 || 45 || 10 || 55 || 10 || 17 ||  0.6 || 0.7 || 6.4 || 1.4 || 7.8 || 3.2 || 2.4
|- class="sortbottom"
! colspan=3| Career
! 33
! 25
! 23
! 204
! 99
! 303
! 117
! 63
! 0.8
! 0.7
! 6.2
! 3.0
! 9.2
! 3.0
! 1.9
|}

References

External links

  

Living people
1997 births
Collingwood Football Club players
Adelaide Football Club players
Oakleigh Chargers players
Australian rules footballers from Melbourne
People educated at Carey Baptist Grammar School
People from Kew, Victoria